Late may refer to:

 LATE, an acronym which could stand for: 
 Limbic-predominant age-related TDP-43 encephalopathy, a proposed form of dementia
 Local-authority trading enterprise, a New Zealand business law
 Local average treatment effect, a concept in econometrics

Music
 Late (album), a 2000 album by The 77s
 Late!, a pseudonym used by Dave Grohl on his Pocketwatch album
 Late (rapper), an underground rapper from Wolverhampton
 "Late" (song), a song by Blue Angel
 "Late", a song by Kanye West from Late Registration

Other
 Late (Tonga), an uninhabited volcanic island southwest of Vavau in the kingdom of Tonga
 "Late" (The Handmaid's Tale), a television episode
 LaTe, Oy Laivateollisuus Ab, a defunct shipbuilding company
 Late may refer to a person who is Dead

See also
 
 
 Lates, a genus of fish in the lates perch family
 Later (disambiguation)
 Tardiness
 Tardiness (scheduling)